The men's synchronized trampoline competition at the 2019 European Games was held at the Minsk-Arena on 24 June 2019.

Results

References 

Men's synchronized trampoline